The  was the 2017 edition of the annual Japanese national cup tournament, which began on 22 April 2017 and ended with the finals on 1 January 2018.

Cerezo Osaka won the tournament for the first time as a J.League club.  It had won the cup 43 years ago, in 1974 when the club was playing for Japan Soccer League as Yanmar Diesel. As a result of this win, Cerezo automatically qualified to the group stage of the 2018 AFC Champions League.

Calendar

From Third round up to Quarter-finals, the team playing in lower-tier of the league system (or lower ranked team if in same level) will have home advantage. Should the home team's stadium not fulfill requirements or the playing team is involved in 2017 AFC Champions League, organizers may assign other stadium instead.

Participating clubs
88 clubs competed in the tournament. Clubs playing in the 2017 J1 League and 2017 J2 League received a bye to the second round of the tournament. The remaining teams entered in the first round.

Schedule and results 
''All times given in UTC+09:00

First round

Second round

Third round

Fourth round

Quarterfinals

Semifinals

Final

References

External links
 Japan Football Association page on the Emperor's Cup (Japanese)

Emperor's Cup
Emperor's Cup
Cup
Cup